This is a list of  in Japan by population as defined by the Statistics Bureau of Japan (SBJ) and the Center for Spatial Information Service of the University of Tokyo. The region containing most of the people in Japan between Tokyo and Fukuoka is often called the Taiheiyō Belt.

Population Census
The Statistics Bureau of Japan (SBJ) defines a metropolitan area as one or more central cities and its associated outlying municipalities. To qualify as an outlying municipality, the municipality must have at least 1.5% of its resident population aged 15 and above commuting to school or work into one of the central cities. To qualify as a central city, a city must either be a designated city of any population or a non-designated city with a city proper population of at least 500,000.  Metropolitan areas of designated cities are defined as "major metropolitan areas" (大都市圏) while those of non-designated cities are simply "metropolitan areas" (都市圏). If multiple central cities are close enough such that their outlying cities overlap, they are combined and a single metropolitan area is defined rather than independently.

2015 Population Census
The metropolitan areas written in bold are the 11 major metropolitan areas of Japan.

2015
MMA: Major Metropolitan Area
MA: Metropolitan Area
Source: Statistics Bureau of Japan

2010 Population Census
The metropolitan areas written in bold are the 11 major metropolitan areas of Japan.

2010
MMA: Major Metropolitan Area
MA: Metropolitan Area
Source: Statistics Bureau of Japan

Changes from 2005 census

The following changes to metropolitan area definitions were made in the 2010 Census report.
 New central cities in Kantō and Keihanshin major metropolitan areas
 Sagamihara in the Kantō MMA and Sakai in the Keihanshin MMA have become designated cities in 2010 and 2006 respectively. These cities are already well within their MMAs and should not greatly alter their formation.
 Niigata and Okayama major metropolitan areas
Niigata became a designated city in 2007 and Okayama became a designated city in 2009. These cities therefore formed major metropolitan areas in the 2010 census.
 Shizuoka, Hamamatsu major metropolitan area
Hamamatsu also became a designated city in 2007. As its outlying areas overlap with Shizuoka, the two cities formed a single major metropolitan area in the 2010 census.
 Utsunomiya metropolitan area
Utsunomiya qualified as a central city for the 2010 census, resulting from mergers with neighboring municipalities and subsequent population growth.

2005 Population Census
The metropolitan areas written in bold are the 8 major metropolitan areas of Japan.

October 1, 2005
MMA: Major Metropolitan Area
MA: Metropolitan Area
Source: Statistics Bureau of Japan

Urban Employment Area

Urban Employment Area is another definition of metropolitan areas, defined by the Center for Spatial Information Service, the University of Tokyo.

2015 
The Center for Spatial Information Service, the University of Tokyo has defined 100 metropolitan employment areas (MEAs) and 122 micropolitan employment areas (McEAs) for Japan.

2010 

The Japanese Ministry of Economy, Trade and Industry defined 233 areas for the UEAs of Japan.
MEA: Metropolitan Employment Area
Source: Ministry of Economy, Trade and Industry of Japan, Center for Spatial Information Science, the University of Tokyo

See also
Metropolitan Area
List of cities in Japan
List of metropolitan areas by population

References

External links
 Population Census of Japan
 Metropolitan Employment Area Map

Japan
 
Metropolitan areas